Laetitia Aoun (born 14 April 2001) is a Lebanese taekwondo practitioner. She won one of the bronze medals in the women's 53 kg event at the 2018 Asian Games held in Jakarta, Indonesia. She is also a bronze medalist at the 2021 Islamic Solidarity Games held in Konya, Turkey.

In 2018, she also competed in the women's 57 kg event at the Mediterranean Games held in Tarragona, Catalonia, Spain where she was eliminated in her first match by Joana Cunha of Portugal.

She competed in the women's bantamweight event at the 2019 World Taekwondo Championships held in Manchester, United Kingdom where she was eliminated in her first match by Ewa Jamiołkowska of Poland.

In 2021, she competed at the Asian Olympic Qualification Tournament held in Amman, Jordan hoping to qualify for the 2020 Summer Olympics in Tokyo, Japan.

She competed in the women's featherweight event at the 2022 World Taekwondo Championships held in Guadalajara, Mexico.

References

External links 
 

Living people
2001 births
Place of birth missing (living people)
Lebanese female taekwondo practitioners
Competitors at the 2018 Mediterranean Games
Mediterranean Games competitors for Lebanon
Taekwondo practitioners at the 2018 Asian Games
Medalists at the 2018 Asian Games
Asian Games bronze medalists for Lebanon
Asian Games medalists in taekwondo
Islamic Solidarity Games medalists in taekwondo
Islamic Solidarity Games competitors for Lebanon
21st-century Lebanese women